Willard Max Bossert (July 9, 1906 – May 15, 1990) was an American football coach and Republican member of the Pennsylvania House of Representatives.  He served as the head football coach at the State Teacher's College in Lock Haven—now Lock Haven University of Pennsylvania—from 1940 to 1942 and again in 1945, compiling a record of 14–12–3.  Bossert was also the school's head wrestling and boxing coach during that time.  He died on May 15, 1990, at the age of 83.

References

External links
 

1906 births
1990 deaths
20th-century American politicians
Lock Haven Bald Eagles football coaches
Lycoming Warriors football coaches
Lock Haven Bald Eagles wrestling coaches
Republican Party members of the Pennsylvania House of Representatives
Lock Haven University of Pennsylvania alumni
People from Clinton County, Pennsylvania